Stephen Anthony Abas (born January 12, 1978) is an American Olympic freestyle wrestler and mixed martial artist.  Abas became a three-time NCAA Division I wrestling champion in the  weight division while attending Fresno State University.  He has competed in two world freestyle championships and received a silver medal at the 2004 Olympic Games.

Early life
Abas graduated from James Logan High School as a star wrestler. During high school, Abas was a three-time California wrestling state champion. Prior to JLHS he attended Canyon Springs High School in Moreno Valley. He and his brother Gerry Abas were members of the Wan Tu Wazuri wrestling club at Oakland Technical High School in Oakland.

College career
Wrestling for Fresno State from 1998–2002, he earned four All-American honors and three National Championships at the NCAA DI wrestling championships. Abas placed fourth in the 118-pound weight class as a freshman and won the next three years in the  weight class. He finished his college career with a 144-4 record, with 46 pins, going undefeated his last two college seasons.

International wrestling career
Abas also is a decorated freestyle wrestler; competing in two world freestyle championships and receiving a silver medal at the 2004 Olympic Games. At the 2005 NCAA championships, he was named as one of the fifteen greatest wrestlers in NCAA history, alongside other standouts such as Kurt Angle, Cael Sanderson, and Dan Gable. Abas was also elected to the NCAA 75th Anniversary Wrestling Team.

Abas tried out for the 2008 USA Olympic Team and reached the finals of the Olympic Trials, losing to Henry Cejudo in a best-of-3 series, 2 matches to 1, even though he competed with a damaged knee. In 2008, he retired from competitive wrestling.

Mixed martial arts career
He began an MMA career. He teaches and trains out of The Arena MMA gym in San Diego, alongside other notable athletes such as Diego Sanchez, Joe Duarte, Rani Yahya, K. J. Noons, Fabricio Camoes, and Xande Ribeiro.

MMA record

|-
| Win
| align=center | 3-0
| Clint Gerona
| TKO (Retirement)
| Rebel Fighter – Annihilation
| August 13, 2011
| align=center | 3
| align=center | 5:00
| Amador County Fairgrounds, Plymouth, California
|
|-
| Win
| align=center | 2-0
| Joey de la Cruz
| Decision (Unanimous)
| TPF 5: Stars and Strikes
| September 7, 2010
| align=center | 3
| align=center | 3:00
| Tachi Palace Hotel and Casino, Lemoore, California
|
|-
| Win
| align=center | 1-0
| Sam Stevens-Milo
| Decision (Majority)
| TPF 4: Cinco de Mayhem
| May 5, 2010
| align=center | 3
| align=center | 3:00
| Tachi Palace Hotel and Casino, Lemoore, California
| Bantamweight debut

Personal life
In 2009, Abas was inducted into the Fresno County Athletic Hall of Fame. In 2018, Abas was inducted into the National Wrestling Hall of Fame as a Distinguished Member.

References

External links
 The Arena
 Stephen Abas profile at the National Wrestling Hall of Fame
 

Living people
Olympic silver medalists for the United States in wrestling
Wrestlers at the 2004 Summer Olympics
1978 births
Medalists at the 2004 Summer Olympics
American male sport wrestlers
Wrestlers at the 2003 Pan American Games
Pan American Games gold medalists for the United States
Pan American Games medalists in wrestling
Medalists at the 2003 Pan American Games
20th-century American people
21st-century American people